"Boa Constrictor" is a song written by Shel Silverstein and originally featured on his 1962 album Inside Folk Songs.

Johnny Cash version 
The song was covered by Johnny Cash for his 1966 comedy album Everybody Loves a Nut.

Released as the third single from the album (Columbia 4-43763, with a non-album track "Bottom of a Mountain" on the opposite side), the song reached number 39 on the U.S. Billboard country chart. and number 33 on the Cash Box country chart.

In January 1967 the song was re-released as a single with "The One on the Right Is on the Left" on the other side.

Lyrical analysis and background

Track listings

Charts

References

External links 
 "Boa Constrictor" on the Johnny Cash official website

Snakes in popular culture
Songs about reptiles
Shel Silverstein songs
Johnny Cash songs
1966 singles
Columbia Records singles
1962 songs
Songs written by Shel Silverstein
Novelty songs
American country music songs
Peter, Paul and Mary songs
Song recordings produced by Don Law